The Hart family murders was a murder–suicide which took place on March 26, 2018, in Mendocino County, California, United States. Jennifer Hart and her wife, Sarah Hart, murdered their six adopted children: Ciera (aged 12), Abigail (14), Jeremiah (14), Devonte (15), Hannah (16), and Markis (19) when Jennifer intentionally drove the family's sport utility vehicle off a cliff. Jennifer was in the driver’s seat, and Sarah was in the front passenger seat.

Background
Jennifer Jean Hart (June 4, 1979 – March 26, 2018) and Sarah Margaret Hart (April 8, 1979 – March 26, 2018) were both from South Dakota; Jennifer originated from Huron, Sarah from Big Stone City, although some sources claim Ortonville, Minnesota  adjacent to Big Stone City  as Sarah's hometown. Both women were the eldest children of their families. Jennifer had two siblings and Sarah had three siblings. According to her father, Jennifer was not initially raised as a Lutheran but was baptized as one.

Jennifer attended Huron High School. Sarah attended high school in Minnesota. The two women attended and began their relationship at Northern State University (NSU); Sarah had initially attended the University of Minnesota for one semester before transferring to NSU, while Jennifer started at Augustana University before transferring in 1999. Both women majored in elementary education, with Sarah focusing on special education. After Sarah graduated in 2002, Jennifer left the university without graduating. In 2005, Sarah asked a local court to have her last name altered to match her partner's. The couple went to Connecticut to be married in 2009; at the time same-sex marriage was not yet legal in every U.S. state.

On Facebook, Jennifer stated that the women were initially closeted when they lived in South Dakota, and that when they came out they lost friends. They moved to Alexandria, Minnesota, in 2004, where both women worked at a Herberger's store. In the new location, they made a choice to be open about their relationship. Jennifer worked miscellaneous jobs until she became a stay-at-home mom in 2006, while Sarah became a manager at Herberger's. After a period of living in West Linn, Oregon, the Harts moved to an unincorporated area near Woodland, Washington; Sarah became a manager at a Kohl's in Hazel Dell. The couple were living near Woodland at the time of the murders. 

The Harts received funds from the state of Texas, covering their six adopted children, which accounted for almost 50% of the family's income. Members of Jennifer's and Sarah's families stated that the two women distanced themselves from them, although both families were accepting of their sexual orientation. Jennifer estranged herself from her father after 2001. State government reports stated that the couple cut off contact with their relatives because of criticism about their parenting.

Adoption
Prior to adopting their six children, the Harts were foster parents to a 15-year-old girl. A week before their first three children were due to arrive, the Harts dropped the girl off at a scheduled therapist appointment. The therapist then informed the girl that the Harts would not be coming back for her.

Abigail (born 2003), Hannah Jean (born 2002), and Markis Hart (born 1998) were adopted by the Harts from Colorado County, Texas; the placement came on March 4, 2006, and they were adopted that September. In June 2008, they adopted three additional children: Ciera Maija (born 2005), Devonte Jordan (born 2002), and Jeremiah Hart (born 2004), originating from Houston. After their biological mother, Sherry Davis, lost custody due to substance abuse problems in August 2006, the Davis children were given to their paternal aunt, Priscilla Celestine, under the condition that they have no contact with their biological mother. However, after she was required to work another shift, Celestine allowed Davis to babysit the children, which a case worker observed. As a result, the children were removed from Celestine's care and a court prevented Celestine from obtaining permanent custody. The Davis children were put into foster care; their older brother, Dontay, was not adopted by the Harts due to behavioral issues.

Prior to the murders, 12-year-old Devonte came into the national spotlight when he was photographed crying as he embraced a police officer during a 2014 protest in Portland, Oregon, resulting from the Ferguson unrest. The image became known as the "hug felt 'round the world." Jennifer was very active on social media and used Facebook to project an image of a loving, happy family while also sharing her thoughts on race, politics, and trips the family went on. This helped mask some of the problems within the family. One allegation of child abuse from 2013 touched upon Jennifer's use of Facebook, saying that "the kids pose and are made to look like one big happy family, but after the photo event, they go back to looking lifeless."

Abuse

Minnesota
In 2008, while the family was living in Minnesota, a teacher observed bruises on Hannah's left arm, and was told she had been hit by Jennifer with a belt. Within months, all six children had been pulled out of the public school system for a year. In 2010, Abigail said that she had "owies" on her back and stomach, stating that she felt threatened by the Harts. The Harts had beaten her and held her head in cold water over a penny they assumed had been stolen.  When authorities became involved, all children claimed that they had been spanked constantly and deprived of food. Sarah took responsibility for the abuse, pled guilty to assault, and was sentenced to community service for a year. One year later, Hannah reportedly told a school nurse that she had not eaten all day; Sarah claimed that Hannah was merely "playing the food card" and recommended that she just be given water. Soon afterward, all six children were taken out of public schools and were homeschooled from then on.

Oregon
In 2013, Oregon authorities were notified of the abuse allegations in Minnesota. Their investigation included separate interviews of everyone in the family, as well as interviews of people who knew the family. Two family friends stated that the children were forced to raise their hands before speaking, could not wish each other a happy birthday, and could not laugh at the dinner table. There were other reports that the children were poorly fed and looked small for their ages. One family friend reported that Jennifer had ordered a pizza for the children, but each was only allowed to have a small slice. When Jennifer discovered that the pizza was gone, she punished the children by not feeding them breakfast and forcing them to lie on their bed for five hours. Friends also stated that the children acted "scared to death of Jen" and likened them to "trained robots". 

However, the interviews of the children themselves revealed no new incidents of abuse, nor did they mention anything that had happened in Minnesota. When Jennifer herself was interviewed, she claimed that any family problems were the results of others not being tolerant to two lesbian mothers with six African-American children. In the end, the investigation could not conclude whether the Harts were guilty of anything or whether there was a "safety threat".

Washington
In August 2017, after the Harts had since moved to Woodland, Washington, Hannah jumped out of her second-story bedroom window at around 1:30 a.m. and approached the residence of her next-door neighbors, the DeKalbs. Hannah reportedly pleaded, "Don't make me go back! They're racists and they abuse us!" Soon afterwards, the Harts found Hannah and took her back home. The following day, Jennifer attempted to explain the incident by claiming that Hannah was lying, that the children occasionally acted out because they were "drug babies," and that Hannah's biological mother was bipolar.

After this incident, the DeKalb family came into contact with Devonte, who constantly begged for food and asked the DeKalbs not to tell Jennifer about these requests. In later conversations with Devonte, he told them that his adoptive mothers withheld food as punishment and that the children were sometimes abused. This, combined with the earlier incident with Hannah, made the DeKalbs report the Harts to both the police and to the Washington State Department of Social and Health Services (DSHS). Case workers from DSHS tried to reach the Harts twice: once on March 23, 2018—three days before the murders—and once on the day of the murders.

Deaths
On March 26, 2018, Jennifer and  Sarah Hart murdered all six of their children when Jennifer drove their vehicle, a GMC Yukon XL, over a  cliff on California State Route 1, in Mendocino County, California, near Westport. The bodies of five of the children (Hannah, Markis, Jeremiah, Abigail, and Ciera) were found in or near the vehicle, which had landed upside down on a beach below the cliff. The body of Devonte has not been found .

Expert analysis of the SUV’s internal air bag-deploying computer determined that the Yukon had been intentionally driven off the edge of the cliff from a standing stop, accelerating to 20mph in 3 seconds with the throttle at 100%. A fourteen-member coroner's jury unanimously ruled the case a murder–suicide. The inquest was called to determine cause of death, but not any responsibility in the civil or criminal fields. The California Highway Patrol stated that criminal prosecution was not possible due to the deaths of any responsible parties.

Toxicology results showed that Jennifer's blood alcohol content was over the legal limit at the time of the crash, and that both Sarah and two of the children had diphenhydramine in their systems. Sarah had made Google searches before the crash, inquiring about the lethality of Benadryl and the nature of death by drowning. Her searches also included "No-kill shelters for dogs"; the family's two dogs were found inside the Hart family home. The Mendocino County Sheriff's Department officially closed the case and released declassified records in 2019.

According to an incident report following the murders, it was reported that Sarah told a co-worker "[that] she wish[ed] someone told her it was okay not to have a big family. Then she and Jennifer would not have adopted the children."

See also
 Disappearance of Susan Powell
 Filicide
 List of homicides in California
 Murder of Hannah Clarke
 Murder of Zachary Turner
 "Three Slaps"

References

External links
 "Hart Family" Index of articles from The Seattle Times
 Broken Harts podcast and Broken Harts: Behind the Episodes (includes transcripts) – Glamour
 MEDIA ADVISORY/NEWS RELEASE. Mendocino County Sheriff's Office (MCSO). April 7, 2018.
 
 http://cdn.cnn.com/cnn/2018/images/04/25/2013.07.23.cps-report_redacted[5].pdf – Minnesota child protective services (CPS) report, posted by CNN
 Priscilla Celestine v. Department of Family and Protective Services—Appeal from 313th District Court of Harris County

2018 controversies in the United States
2018 murders in the United States
2018 road incidents
2018 suicides
21st-century LGBT people
21st-century mass murder in the United States
Child abuse in the United States
Child abuse resulting in death
Filicides in California
Criminal duos
March 2018 crimes in the United States
Mass murder in 2018
Mass murder in California
Mass murder in the United States
Murder–suicides in California
Road incidents in the United States